Ispidina is a genus of small insectivorous African river kingfishers.

The genus was introduced by the German naturalist Johann Jakob Kaup in 1848 with the African pygmy kingfisher (Ispidina picta) as the type species. The genus is the sister group to the genus Corythornis containing four small African kingfishers.

Species
The two species in the genus are:

These similar small kingfishers can be distinguished by the blue crown of the African pigmy kingfisher. They have different habit preferences and have mostly non-overlapping ranges. The slightly smaller African dwarf kingfisher occurs in tropical rainforests while the African pygmy kingfisher occurs in dry grassy woodland.

References

 
Alcedininae
Bird genera